Pilavo is a volcano in Ecuador. It is more a shield volcano than a stratovolcano and was active about 20,000/40,000 - 8,000 years before present with basaltic andesite-andesite lava flows.

Geography and geomorphology 

Pilavo is part of the volcanic arc of Ecuador. Other volcanoes in the arc are Pichincha, Pululagua and Sumaco. 

Parulo volcano lies off the western margin of Pilavo; a lava flow of which forms a lava dam at Laguna Donoso.

Geology 

Off the western coast of South America, the Nazca Plate subducts beneath the South America Plate.

Pilavo lies west of the main volcanic arc and is constructed on a crust that is in part derived from the Caribbean large igneous province, part of which were integrated on the Ecuadorean coast and gave the crust thus a mafic signature. Otherwise, the basement includes Cretaceous marine and volcanic sequences, and is cut by a number of faults which controlled the location of the volcanic vents including these of Pilavo.

Pilavo has erupted andesite and basaltic andesite, which contain hornblende, plagioclase and pyroxene and are covered with soils. Phenocrysts of amphibole, clinopyroxene and plagioclase are found in the lava, which defines a tholeiitic suite with low potassium content.

Eruption history 

The weak glacial erosion and the presence of younger tephras in the soils imply that Pilavo erupted between 20,000/40,000-8,000 years before present. The volcanic activity took place in three different stages, including one which formed the Parulo volcano whose temporal relationship to the main Pilavo volcano is however unclear.

References

Sources

External links
 

Stratovolcanoes of Ecuador
Pleistocene stratovolcanoes